Dol pri Šmarju is a settlement in the hills south of Šmarje pri Jelšah in eastern Slovenia. The Municipality of Šmarje pri Jelšah is included in the Savinja Statistical Region. It is part of the historical Styria region.

Name
The name of the settlement was changed from Dol to Dol pri Šmarju in 1953.

References

External links
Dol pri Šmarju at Geopedia

Populated places in the Municipality of Šmarje pri Jelšah